Clinical Cardiology is a monthly peer-reviewed medical journal covering cardiology that was established in 1978. It is published by John Wiley & Sons and the editor-in-chief is A. John Camm (St George's, University of London). It is an official journal of the American Society for Preventive Cardiology.

According to the Journal Citation Reports, the journal has a 2020 impact factor of 2.882.

References

External links

Publications established in 1978
Cardiology journals
Monthly journals
English-language journals
Wiley (publisher) academic journals